Ramesh Kumar Vankwani is a Pakistani politician who has been a member of the National Assembly of Pakistan, since August 2018. But in 2022 he left PTI. Previously he was member of the National Assembly from June 2013 to May 2018 and a member of the Provincial Assembly of Sindh from 2002 to 2007.

Education & Background
Vankwani possesses Bachelor's Degree of Medicine and Bachelor's Degree of Surgery.
He was born into a Sindhi Hindu family.

Political career

Vankwani ran for the seat of the Provincial Assembly of Sindh as an independent candidate from Constituency PS-61 (Tharparkar-II) in the 2002 Pakistani general election, but was unsuccessful. He received 34 votes and lost the seat to a candidate of National Alliance. In the same election, he was elected to the Provincial Assembly of Sindh as a candidate of Pakistan Muslim League (Q) on a reserved seat for minorities. He founded Pakistan Hindu Council in 2005.

Vankwani was elected to the National Assembly of Pakistan as a candidate of Pakistan Muslim League (N) (PML-N) on a reserved seat for minorities in the 2013 Pakistani general election.

Vankwani came to the limelight in September 2014, when he along with Rehman Malik was removed from a flight from Karachi to Islamabad because of their late check-in which caused the flight to delay.

Vankwani January 2018, he was elected as the chairman of the National Assembly's Standing Committee for Statistics. In April 2018, he quit PML-N and joined Pakistan Tehreek-e-Insaf (PTI).

He was re-elected to the National Assembly as a candidate of PTI on a reserved seat for minorities in 2018 Pakistani general election. He stood against his party policy in no confidence motion.

See also
Mahesh Kumar Malani
Pakistan Hindu Council

References

Living people
Pakistani MNAs 2013–2018
Pakistani Hindus
Sindh MPAs 2002–2007
Pakistan Muslim League (N) MNAs
Pakistani MNAs 2018–2023
1974 births